Outsights is an independent scenario planning consultancy founded in 1998 by Richard O'Brien and Tim Bolderson. The company is based in Islington, London, with seven full-time employees and 30 associates. Outsights uses scenario planning and future thinking to help business, Government and organisations to anticipate, interpret and act upon important external developments in the outside world, and to plan strategies for several possible futures.

In 2006, Outsights created the Sigma Scan, an online database of trends and drivers over the next 50 years for the UK Government, in partnership with Ipsos MORI. Scenario planning is currently being used to help advise UK Government policy, for example in the "Tackling Obesities: Future Choices Project" which was launched by Health Minister Dawn Primolo in October 2007.

References 

"Vision of life in the middle of the century", FT, 20 December 2006
 "Robots could demand legal rights", BBC, 21 December 2006
"Science's crystal ball: A look into the future", The Independent, 21 December 2006
"Human rights for robots? We're getting carried away", Times Online, 24 April 2007

Case studies in scenario planning 
Irdeto: Facing the future through scenario planning

External links 
Official website
Sigma Scan

Companies based in the London Borough of Islington
Strategic management
Companies established in 1998